Wilhelm "Willi" Kuhweide (born 6 January 1943) is a former West German sailor. He competed in one-person dinghy at the 1964 and 1968 Olympics and 1963, 1966 and 1967 world championships and won on all occasions except in 1968. He then changed to two-person and three person keelboat events and won a bronze medal at the 1972 Olympics, placing sixth-eighth in 1976 and 1984; he missed the 1980 Moscow Games due to their boycott by West Germany.

References

External links

1943 births
Living people
German male sailors (sport)
Olympic sailors of the United Team of Germany
Olympic sailors of West Germany
Olympic gold medalists for the United Team of Germany
Olympic bronze medalists for West Germany
Olympic medalists in sailing
Medalists at the 1964 Summer Olympics
Medalists at the 1972 Summer Olympics
Sailors at the 1964 Summer Olympics – Finn
Sailors at the 1968 Summer Olympics – Finn
Sailors at the 1972 Summer Olympics – Star
Sailors at the 1976 Summer Olympics – Soling
Sailors at the 1984 Summer Olympics – Soling
Sportspeople from Berlin
Star class world champions
Finn class world champions
World champions in sailing for Germany
Lufthansa people
European Champions Soling